SignPlot is a software application for the design of UK traffic signs and their supports and foundations, developed and sold by Buchanan Computing.

History
Initially created in the early 1980s as a university project by Simon Morgan, SignPlot 3 has undergone several updates. The program is designed to automate almost all the layout and spacing rules of the Traffic Signs Regulations and General Directions, Traffic Signs Manual Chapter 7, and drawings issued by the Welsh Assembly Government for bilingual signing.

See also 
 Road signs in the United Kingdom
 Traffic sign
 Highways Act 1980
 Highway Code
 Road Traffic Regulation Act 1984

References

External links
Signs & Markings. Part of the Highway Code website.
"War to Worboys" - CBRD article detailing the development of Road signs from the Second World War to the present day

Transport software
Windows-only software
Road transport in the United Kingdom